Massicus is a genus of round-necked longhorn beetles of the subfamily Cerambycinae.

Cladogram

References
 Biolib
 Catalogue of Life

External links

Cerambycini